The ninth and final season of the American superhero television series The Flash, which is based on the DC Comics character Barry Allen / Flash, premiered on February 8, 2023. It is set in the Arrowverse, sharing continuity with the other television series of the universe. It will also act as the conclusion of the Arrowverse. The season is produced by Berlanti Productions, Warner Bros. Television, and DC Entertainment, with Eric Wallace serving as showrunner.

The season was announced on March 22, 2022 and later confirmed to be the final season on August 1. Filming for the season began that September 2022 and concluded in March 2023. Grant Gustin stars as Barry Allen / Flash, with principal cast members Candice Patton, Danielle Panabaker, Danielle Nicolet, Kayla Compton, and Brandon McKnight also returning from previous seasons, while Jon Cor was promoted to series regular from his recurring status in the previous two seasons.

Episodes 

Season nine will consist of 13 episodes. They will be broken into at least two "Graphic Novel" storyline arcs, known as the eighth and ninth graphic novels respectively; this numbering continues from the first seven "Graphic Novels" established in the previous three seasons.

Danielle Panabaker directed the ninth episode, while Kayla Compton directed the eleventh.

Cast and characters

Main 
 Grant Gustin as Barry Allen / The Flash
 Candice Patton as Iris West-Allen
 Danielle Panabaker as Khione / Snow
 Danielle Nicolet as Cecile Horton
 Kayla Compton as Allegra Garcia
 Brandon McKnight as Chester P. Runk
 Jon Cor as Mark Blaine / Chillblaine

Recurring 
 Jesse L. Martin as Joe West
 Carmen Moore as Kristen Kramer
 Richard Harmon as Owen Mercer / Captain Boomerang
 Andy Mientus as Hartley Rathaway / Pied Piper
 Magda Apanowicz as Andrea Wozzeck / Fiddler

Guest

Production

Development 
In April 2020, series star Grant Gustin said there had been discussions about renewing the series through a ninth season, but those were stalled due to the COVID-19 pandemic. In January 2022, when the eighth season was in its mid-season hiatus, Gustin signed a one-year deal for 15 episodes for a ninth season, with his salary increased to $200,000 per episode. On March 22, 2022, The CW renewed the series for a ninth season. On August 1, it was announced that it would be the final season of the series, with an abbreviated 13-episode order. Showrunner Eric Wallace stated that the cast and crew had originally expected the series to end with the eighth season, but after the ninth season was ordered, Wallace rewrote the season eight finale to not be a series finale.

Writing 
Prior to learning that the ninth season would be the series' last and that it would have only 13 episodes, Wallace created additional storylines he hoped to include in the ninth season and a potential tenth season. These would have included a wrap-up to Legends of Tomorrow, the appearance of Max Mercury, an original storyline titled The Forever War, an adaptation of the Blackest Night storyline, and a storyline featuring the Justice League fighting Despero in another alien invasion.  After the final 13 episodes were ordered, Wallace's plans for the 200th episode were moved to the series finale.

Casting 
Main cast members Gustin, Candice Patton, Danielle Nicolet, Kayla Compton and Brandon McKnight return as Barry Allen / The Flash, Iris West-Allen, Cecile Horton, Allegra Garcia and Chester P. Runk. Jesse L. Martin, who portrayed Joe West throughout the series, exited as a regular, though he is expected to recur in the season. In October 2022, Jon Cor was promoted to series regular for the season.

Danielle Panabaker, who had portrayed Caitlin Snow and Frost in previous seasons, was reported to be returning, but was later confirmed to be playing a new character whose identity was later revealed in the second episode. Ahead of this, Panabaker stated that this character would be called Snow at the beginning of the season; Snow was later revealed to be using the name Khione.

Filming 
Filming began on September 14, 2022, and concluded on March 6, 2023.

Release 
The season premiered on February 8, 2023, with the finale being scheduled to premiere on May 24, 2023.

Ratings

Notes

References

External links 
 

2023 American television seasons
The Flash (2014 TV series) seasons